Siôn Llewelyn Simon (born 23 December 1968) is a British Labour Party politician who served as the Member of Parliament (MP) for Birmingham Erdington from 2001 to 2010 and as a Member of the European Parliament (MEP) for the West Midlands from 2014 to 2019.

Simon was the Parliamentary Under-Secretary of State for Further Education from 2008 to 2009 and Parliamentary Under-Secretary of State for Creative Industries from 2009 to 2010. He stood down at the 2010 general election to campaign for a directly elected mayor of Birmingham, with the intent of running in the first election. In 2014 Simon was elected a Member of the European Parliament for the West Midlands. In 2016 he was selected as the Labour Party candidate for Mayor of the West Midlands but was defeated in the 2017 election by 50.4% to 49.6% of the vote in the final round. In 2019, he lost his seat at the European Parliament election.

Early life
Simon was born in Doncaster to Welsh-speaking parents, and was raised in Birmingham, where he lived in Great Barr, Handsworth and Handsworth Wood. His parents were both teachers in Birmingham. He attended Handsworth Grammar School, where he joined the Labour Party at the age of 16. Simon enrolled at Magdalen College, Oxford, in 1987, where he read Philosophy, Politics and Economics. He was elected President of the college Junior Common Room in his second year.

After university, he was a research assistant for George Robertson MP for three years. He worked for two years in the Guinness management team at Diageo, then a FTSE top 20 company. He then freelanced at speechwriting, policy and advice. His clients included Tony Blair while in opposition, Microsoft UK, the International Duty Free Confederation and various charities and communication companies. He then became a journalist, working for The Daily Telegraph, the Daily Express and the News of the World. He was also an associate editor at The Spectator. His columns varied from restaurant reviews to politics.

In the 1992 election campaign, Simon ran the European desk for the Labour Party and then, during the 1997 election campaign, the foreign press department at Labour Party headquarters.

Member of Parliament
Simon was first elected in the 2001 general election for Birmingham Erdington with a majority of 9,962. He retained the seat in 2005 with a slightly reduced majority of 9,575.

As a backbencher he served on the Public Accounts Committee, Treasury Select Committee, chaired the All-Party Parliamentary Group on Private Equity and Venture Capital and the All-Party Parliamentary Group on Business Services.

Shortly after Gordon Brown became Prime Minister in July 2007, Simon became Vice-Chair of the Labour Party, with special responsibility to draft the "Law and Order" manifesto for the upcoming 2010 general election.

Following the October 2008 reshuffle, Simon was appointed Parliamentary Under-Secretary of State for Further Education in the Department for Innovation, Universities and Skills. In June 2009 he became Parliamentary Under Secretary of State for Creative Industries in the Department for Culture, Media and Sport.

On 3 February 2010 he announced he would not stand for re-election to Parliament, in order to campaign for a directly elected mayor of Birmingham, and stand in a subsequent election. A referendum was held in Birmingham on 3 May 2012, but the proposal was defeated with 57.8% of the vote.

After leaving parliament, Simon founded the website Labour Uncut in May 2010. In 2011, he wrote a cover story for Newsweek about the August riot disturbances. He also supported HS2 in an article for Progress. He wrote a chapter in What Next for Labour? Ideas for a new generation titled "Why Mayors Matter and Why Labour Should Support them".

Member of the European Parliament
Placed second on Labour's candidate list, Simon was elected as a Member of the European Parliament for the West Midlands in the 2014 European Parliament elections alongside Neena Gill. In 2014 he joined the European Parliament Committee on Employment and Social Affairs. He lost his seat at the 2019 election.

During the 2016 EU membership referendum vote, Simon participated in the Labour in for Britain pro-EU campaign.

Mayoral candidate 
In 2016, Simon was selected as the Labour candidate for Mayor of the West Midlands. He was defeated in the 2017 mayoral election by Conservative candidate Andy Street by 50.4% of the vote to 49.6% in the final round.

Controversies
On 5 September 2006, he and Chris Bryant co-ordinated a letter, signed by 17 Labour backbenchers, calling for Tony Blair to resign as prime minister. The MPs failed to force Blair out of office, but Blair publicly pledged to stand down within 12 months.

In October 2006, Simon created a YouTube spoof of Conservative Party leader David Cameron's video blog, in which, pretending to be Cameron, he offered viewers one of his children and the opportunity to sleep with his wife. This led to criticism from both parties, with the stunt being called "tasteless". In an interview on Sky News the same day, Simon defended himself and described Cameron's attempts to reach out to the youth culture as "shallow" and "pathetic". The video was removed on 13 October by Tom Watson, whom he described as a "proppa blogga".

In 2009, it was revealed that Simon had breached parliamentary rules by renting his "second home" in London from his sister, Ceri Erskine, and paying her more than £40,000 in taxpayer-funded expenses. Simon claimed that he had inadvertently broken the rules and agreed to repay £21,000. He apologised "unreservedly". Six weeks later Simon announced that he would resign from the government and stand down as MP for Birmingham Erdington.

Personal life
Simon suffers from the rare genetic disorder choroideremia: a condition that leads to progressive deterioration in eyesight, and in its later stage, blindness. He co-founded, and works as a trustee for, the Choroideremia Research Foundation. In January 2014, Simon donated a kidney to Labour MP Khalid Mahmood.

Simon lives in Birmingham, is a member of the Royal Shakespeare Company, and a season ticket holder at West Bromwich Albion F.C.

References

External links
Guardian Unlimited Politics – Ask Aristotle: Sion Simon MP
BBC Interview with Sion Simon MP, Minister for Further Education
TheyWorkForYou.com – Sion Simon MP
Siôn Simon: championing an elected Mayor for Birmingham – campaign website

1968 births
Living people
Labour Party (UK) MPs for English constituencies
UK MPs 2001–2005
UK MPs 2005–2010
Alumni of Magdalen College, Oxford
People from Birmingham, West Midlands
English people of Welsh descent
Erdington
People educated at Handsworth Grammar School
MEPs for England 2014–2019
People from Great Barr
People from Handsworth, West Midlands